Nicholas Ford (June 21, 1833 – June 18, 1897) was a U.S. Representative from Missouri.

Born in Wicklow, Ireland, Ford attended the village school and Maynooth College, Dublin, Ireland.
Ford emigrated to the United States in 1848 with his parents, who settled in Chicago, Illinois.
He moved to St. Joseph, Missouri, in 1859 and later to Colorado and Montana, states in which he engaged in mining.
He returned to Missouri and settled in Rochester, Andrew County, and engaged in mercantile pursuits.

Ford was elected a member of the State house of representatives in 1875.

Ford was elected as a Greenbacker (National Party) to the Forty-sixth and Forty-seventh Congresses (March 4, 1879 – March 3, 1883).
He was an unsuccessful candidate for reelection in 1882 to the Forty-eighth Congress and for election in 1890 to the Fifty-second Congress.
He was an unsuccessful Republican candidate for Governor of Missouri in 1884.
He moved to Virginia City, Nevada.
He served as member of the first city council.
He retired from active business and moved to Miltonvale, Kansas, where he died June 23, 1897.
He was interred in the Catholic Cemetery, Aurora, Kansas.

Ford is the namesake of the community of Ford City, Missouri.

References

External links 
 

1833 births
1897 deaths
19th-century Irish people
People from Wicklow (town)
Irish emigrants to the United States (before 1923)
Greenback Party members of the United States House of Representatives from Missouri
Missouri Greenbacks
Republican Party members of the Missouri House of Representatives
19th-century American politicians
Republican Party members of the United States House of Representatives from Missouri